The Maryland Racing Media Stakes is an American Thoroughbred horse race run in February of each year at Laurel Park Racecourse in Baltimore, Maryland.

It is set at a distance of one and one sixteenth miles (eight and one half furlongs) on the dirt for fillies and mares and three years old and up. It is run for a purse of $100,000.

The race was named in honor of the Maryland Racing Media Association which was organized under the name of the Maryland Racing Writers' Association in 1937. It held its first meeting at Havre de Grave race track in that year. Originally the association was restricted to members of the print media; the membership now includes members from television, radio, publicity and photojournalism as well. The stakes record is held by Irving's Baby who won the race at  miles in 2002 in 1:50.20.

Records 

Most wins: 
 2 – Irving's Baby  (2000, 2002)

Speed record: 
  miles – 1:50.20 – Irving's Baby

Most wins by a jockey:
 3 – Mario Pino     (1993, 1996, 2004)

Most wins by a trainer:
 2 – Todd Pletcher    (2001, 2002)
 2 – Richard W. Small    (2000, 2006)
 2 – Donald H. Barr    (1998, 1999)
 2 – Ronald Cartwright    (1995, 1997)

Most wins by an owner:
 2 – Anstu Stables, Inc.    (2001, 2002)

Winners

A * indicates that All Smiles was disqualified from first and placed second in 2008.
A ** indicates that Proud Owner was disqualified from first and placed fourth in 2000.

See also 
 Maryland Racing Media Stakes top three finishers and starters
 Black-Eyed Susan Stakes 
 Laurel Park Racecourse

References 

 The Gallorette Handicap at Pedigree Query

1992 establishments in Maryland
Laurel Park Racecourse
Horse races in Maryland
Recurring sporting events established in 1992